Delphine is a Canadian short drama film, directed by Chloé Robichaud and released in 2019. The film centres on Delphine, a young Lebanese Canadian girl who is bullied at her school for being ethnically different, and Nicole, one of her only classmates who sympathizes with her instead of participating.

The film stars Daria Oliel-Sabbag as Delphine and Ines Feghouli Bozon as Nicole in childhood, and Ambre Jabrane as Delphine and Wiam Mohktari as Nicole in their teenage years. The film was written by Nathalie Doummar as an adaptation of her own theatrical short play Delphine de Ville Saint-Laurent.

The film premiered at the 76th Venice International Film Festival in the Horizons stream. It was subsequently screened at the 2019 Toronto International Film Festival, where it won the award for Best Canadian Short Film. In December 2019, the film was named to TIFF's annual year-end Canada's Top Ten list for short films.

References

External links
 

2019 films
Films directed by Chloé Robichaud
Films shot in Quebec
Films set in Quebec
French-language Canadian films
Canadian drama short films
2010s Canadian films